BS12 may refer to:
IBM Business System 12, an early relational database management system
BS 12 Specification for Portland Cement, a British Standard
Bonomi BS.12 Roma, a primary glider
Omega BS-12, a utility helicopter